Keysoe Row is a hamlet located in the Borough of Bedford in Bedfordshire, England.

The settlement is located to the south of the village of Keysoe, and is part of the wider Bolnhurst and Keysoe civil parish.

Kymbrook Primary School is located in the area.

References

Hamlets in Bedfordshire
Borough of Bedford